Somnambul is a 1929 German silent horror film directed by Adolf Trotz and starring Fritz Kortner, Erna Morena and Veit Harlan. The film is set against the backdrop of spiritualism. The Berlin clairvoyant Elsbeth Guenther-Geffers appeared in the film. The film's art director was August Rinaldi.

Cast
 Fritz Kortner as Fabrikant Bingen
 Erna Morena as Helga, seine Frau
 Veit Harlan as Kurt Bingen, beider Sohn
 Jaro Fürth as Dr. Höchster
 Eva von Berne as Amélie, seine Tochter
 Fritz Kampers as Maxe, eine zweifelhafte Existenz
 Uly Boutry as Myra, das Medium
 Julius Falkenstein as Spinelli, der Hypnotiseur
 Elsbeth Guenther-Geffers as Die Hellseherin
 Georg John as Der Wirt

References

Bibliography
 Noack, Frank. Veit Harlan: The Life and Work of a Nazi Filmmaker. University Press of Kentucky, 2016.
 Prawer, S.S. Between Two Worlds: The Jewish Presence in German and Austrian Film, 1910–1933. Berghahn Books, 2005.

External links

1929 films
Films of the Weimar Republic
German silent feature films
German horror films
Films directed by Adolf Trotz
1929 horror films
German black-and-white films
Silent horror films
1920s German films